Wing Yip is a Chinese supermarket chain founded by Woon Wing Yip in England in 1970. The original Birmingham store now also serve as its headquarters, international trading division, property investments, online store (mail order), warehouse, and national distribution centre. The company has superstore branches in Manchester, Croydon and Cricklewood.

In addition, the company has expanded into wholesale and export (international trade) and real estate development/management, such as siting its stores within larger commercial centres. Having supplied Chinese restaurants and takeaways, the British Chinese community, and Chinese food enthusiasts for over five decades, its high-quality tofu-based meat substitutes have also made it popular with the rapidly increasing number of people changing to vegan diets since the 2010s.

Founder
The founder, Woon Wing Yip, was a Hakka born in Dongguan County, Guangdong, China, in 1937. He arrived in the United Kingdom from Hong Kong in 1959 with £10. With an annual turnover of 80 million pounds, he became the first Chinese tycoon in the UK.

Wing Yip was honoured by Her Majesty The Queen on 10 March 2010 at an investiture ceremony at Buckingham Palace and awarded an OBE for his services to the Oriental food industry.

Wing Yip said "I was so surprised and feel very honoured, especially after coming here as an immigrant.  I knew when I arrived in the UK that I wanted to be more than a waiter and quickly became head waiter, then opened my first restaurant with my business partners in Clacton in 1962.  I would like to thank all my staff who have provided me with their support and dedication and made the success of Wing Yip possible.”

Chronology

 1959 – Wing Yip arrives in England by boat from Hong Kong.
 1960s – Wing Yip opens a restaurant with partners in a former tea shop in Clacton-on-Sea. This is quickly followed by a further three restaurants and two take-aways in the East Anglia region. In 1968, he is joined by his brother, Sammy Yap who worked in the hotel trade in Hong Kong.
 1970 – Wing Yip and his brother Sammy open a specialist Chinese grocery in Digbeth, Birmingham, supplying more than 1,000 genuine Chinese products to restaurants and takeaways as well as to Chinese families in and around Birmingham.

This first Wing Yip store in Digbeth employs fewer than ten people and quickly gains a following in the Chinese community and with those interested in Chinese cooking.

 1975 – After five years of trading, the business moves to larger premises in nearby Coventry Street where it is to be based for the next 17 years. The new site offers car parking for customers and attracts Chinese business tenants including a travel agent.
 1977 – Lee Sing Yap joins his brothers Wing Yip and Sammy. Together they open a Manchester store on Faulkner Street in Manchester's Chinatown area which enjoys a thriving restaurant scene.
 1978 – A second Manchester store opens on Addington Street. This larger site based outside the city centre provides free car parking and other facilities to meet the demands of restaurant and takeaway owners.
 1986 – The brothers buy and develop a  site on Oldham Road – Manchester on the edge of the city centre. The Manchester operations are brought together at the new premises.
 1988 – The first London store opens in Cricklewood on Edgware Road (A5 next to Junction 1 of the M1). Following the success of the Birmingham and Manchester stores, demand grows from customers based in and around the Greater London area for a store in the south of the country.
 1992 – The Birmingham business moves from Coventry Street to large modern premises in Nechells in Birmingham. The site together with its associated Wing Yip Business Centre attracts tenants such as solicitors, a doctor and accountants who use it as a base to serve the Chinese community.
 1995 – The Wing Yip Brand of sauces launches to enable caterers and food manufacturers to create authentic Chinese meals with the flavour profile of the finest Chinese restaurants and takeaways. A retail range is also launched.
 1995 – The second London store opens in Croydon on Purley Way (A23). The site incorporates its own Business Centre with Chinese and Malaysian restaurants as well as other Chinese businesses. The site becomes a local landmark with its Oriental design and wins a Croydon Design Award for its architecture and Chinese Arch.
The additional land is developed to include a large modern central distribution warehouse and an Oriental-style Business Centre with a range of Chinese businesses including two fine restaurants, a bank, lawyers and accountants.

The landmark Chinese Arch with handmade tiles from China is erected.

 1998 – Wing Yip and his brothers donate a  granite pagoda to the City of Birmingham in thanks to the city and its people for providing a home for them and their families and for the city's support over the years. The pagoda which was hand-carved in China is erected at Holloway Circus close to Birmingham's Chinese Quarter.
 2003 – The Manchester site is redeveloped to provide a truly Oriental setting for customers, with an enlarged cash and carry store and a new Business Centre incorporating a successful Chinese restaurant, a branch of HSBC and other tenants.
 2004 – Wing Yip's online shopping site launches primarily to serve UK consumers and orders are received from Europe and as far away as Australia. The site includes recipes, cooking and dining information as well as cultural sections.

The Wing Yip range of sauces finds favour with visitors to the BBC Good Food Show at the NEC.

 2005 – The Wing Yip exhibit at the International Food Exhibition at Exel in London and tastings of the sauces prove extremely popular with visitors.
The redevelopment of the Cricklewood site begins. The project will see the building of a new enlarged cash and carry store open to the trade and the public with underground parking, a Business Centre including a Chinese restaurant together with an office building all in an Oriental style.
Cricklewood location.

 2008 – Mr Wing Yip was awarded an Honorary Doctorate from Birmingham City University
 2010 – Wing Yip scoops Lifetime Achievement award
 2010 – Mr Wing Yip – OBE
 2013 – The Birmingham site undergoes an extensive redevelopment and refurbishment increasing the site to 10 acres
 2016 Feb – Death of Sammy Yap
 Today – Wing Yip continues to exhibit at popular shows

The Wing Yip Group now operates from four freehold sites covering  and employs 300 staff. 
Other strategic sites in the UK have been proposed and new stores are to be built.

Awards

 October 2008 – The Mai Siam range achieved Gold Stars at the prestigious Great Taste Awards
 September 2008 – Chairman, Wing Yip has recently been presented with two coveted awards in recognition of his outstanding business success and services to the local business economy. Birmingham City University presented him with an honorary doctorate to mark his 36-year contribution to industry in the city.
 April 2008 – Wing Yip (Manchester) Ltd achieved North West Business of the Year in the Ethnic Minority Business Forum Awards, to celebrate the contribution made by black and ethnic minority businesses.
 2006 – Wing Yip was the Winner of The Lord Chan Award for Outstanding Individual.
 June 2005 – Tony Ritson, Information Technology Manager for Wing Yip, wins Best Information Security Manager 2005 as awarded by SC Magazine.
 2008 – Mr Wing Yip was awarded an Honorary Doctorate from Birmingham City University
 2010 – Wing Yip scoops Lifetime Achievement award
 2010 – Mr Wing Yip – OBE
 2012 – Mr Wing Yip was awarded an Honorary Degree from Aston University

Wing Yip bursaries
Wing Yip established the W Wing Yip & Brothers bursaries to encourage and provide financial assistance to a set number of students of Chinese origin, local and from overseas, to complete their studies in the United Kingdom.

Since its inception over 300 bursaries have been granted.

Applications come from across the UK, China, Hong Kong, Malaysia, Taiwan and elsewhere all demonstrating high standards of achievement in various fields from law and medicine to IT and the arts.

The Board of Selectors carefully consider the applicants and agree a select number of outstanding achievers to receive support. Successful applicants are invited to attend a special event to receive their bursaries in the heart of London's Chinatown.

Renowned solicitor Michael Chiu, who was previously on the Board of Selectors, said:  "The standard of all the entrants is always excellent and it is an arduous task to decide on the final list of awards.  We reach our decisions based on three criteria: the students' ability in their field; interest and passion in their subject; and lastly the nature of the core subject itself, which the Board considered to be worthy of support."

Online shopping
Wing Yip Online Store was set up in 2004 to provide customers who are not able to get to one of the Chinese supermarkets, easy access to Wing Yip's products. They also have an online shopping site and a "cookery school".

See also
 Asian supermarket
 Oseyo
 H Mart

References

External links
 Wing Yip Group

Supermarkets of the United Kingdom
Companies based in Birmingham, West Midlands
British companies established in 1970
Retail companies established in 1970
Chinese community in the United Kingdom
Retail companies of the United Kingdom